The ITF Wheelchair Tennis Tour (currently sponsored as the Uniqlo Wheelchair Tennis Tour and abbreviated to the Uniqlo Tour) is a tennis tour for disabled men and women. There are three divisions: Men, Women, and Quad. The Quad division is a mixed-gender division, for players which have impairments in at least three limbs, and the competitors are allowed to use motorized wheelchairs. The tour was formed in 1992, comprising just 11 events. The tour now has over 150 events.

Overview
The ITF Wheelchair Tennis Tour is the world tour for wheelchair tennis. It is also the branch of the International Tennis Federation that is designed to protect the interests of the wheelchair tennis game.  As of 2011, 173 tournaments are covered by the tour over many different categories.
The tour's main goals are:
Providing opportunities for thousands of people with physical disabilities to compete in events organised at the highest level of organisation and professionalism.
Offering high intensity competition and excitement for men, women, junior and quad players from the recreational to the professional level.
Increasing awareness for persons with disabilities throughout the world
Giving wheelchair athletes rightful recognition as top sport athletes
Creating opportunities for athletes to enjoy and compete in a sport for a lifetime with able-bodied and disabled people.

History
Wheelchair tennis started in the 1970s through Jeff Minnenbraker and Brad Parks. First tournament took place in Los Angeles in 1977, which was won by Parks. In 1980 the National Foundation of Wheelchair Tennis (NFWT) was formed. A circuit of 10 tournaments within the USA was also established including the first US Open Wheelchair Tennis Championships. In 1981 The Wheelchair Tennis Players Association (WTPA) was formed.

The WTPA was formed to: 
a) Foster competitive wheelchair tennis for the physically disabled throughout the world;
b) Establish and enforce rules which create fair and equitable play for all participants; 
c) Organise a competitive network of tournaments sanctioned by the association; and
d) Formulate a uniform system throughout the world.

Also the WTPA with the NFWT formed the Grand Prix Circuit, linking four tournaments in major cities finishing with the US Open. The first tournaments outside of the USA began in France in 1982 as four tournaments were held. The first team competition the World Team Cup was established in 1985. The NEC Tour was formed in 1992.

In 1998, the WTPA was incorporated into the USTA.

UNIQLO Tour
The UNIQLO Wheelchair Tennis Tour (formerly "NEC Tour") comprises several different categories of events. The most prestigious ones are the Grand Slams and the Wheelchair Tennis Masters. The next level of tournaments is Super Series. The other categories on the main tour are known as ITF 1, 2 and 3 (these were formerly known as the Championship Series) with futures for the developing players (formally known as satellite tour). 
In the Grand Slams, the prize money are determined by the organizers. For the rest of the ITF events, there are minimum amounts of (total) prize money set by the ITF.

See also
List of Wheelchair Tennis Champions
BNP Paribas World Team Cup

References

Wheelchair tennis tournaments
International Tennis Federation
Recurring sporting events established in 1992